Mino Bellei (June 26, 1936 – March 13, 2022) was an Italian theatre and film actor and director.

Career 

Born in Savona in 1936, he graduated from the Accademia d'Arte Drammatica in 1959, and began as a stage actor in pièce by Pirandello, Molière and Shakespeare; critics counted him among the most promising and outstanding talents of these years. In the 1960s he also devoted himself to theater directing. His comedy "Life is not a film of Doris Day" was a great success.

Only occasionally he took roles in film and television; In 1979 he directed the film Bionda fragola (Strawberry blonde) from his own screenplay. Despite good reviews and financial success, it was his only film as director.

 Filmography (selection) 

1965: The Mandrake, dir. Alberto Lattuada
1978: Melodrammore, dir. Maurizio Costanzo
1980: Bionda fragola, dir. Mino Bellei
1988: Topo Galileo, dir. Francesco Laudadio
1989: Un uomo di razza, dir. Bruno Rosia
1999: Tea with Mussolini, dir. Franco Zeffirelli
2002: Pinocchio, dir. Roberto Benigni

 Theatre (selection) In the Jungle of Cities, of Bertolt Brecht, dir. Antonio Calenda, Rome, 1968.La vita non è un film di Doris Day'', dir Mino Bellei, Rome, 1989.

References

External links 
 

1936 births
2022 deaths
Italian theatre directors
People from Savona
Italian male film actors
Italian male stage actors
20th-century Italian male actors